The 1938 Cork Senior Football Championship was the 50th staging of the Cork Senior Football Championship since its establishment by the Cork County Board in 1887. 

Carbery entered the championship as the defending champions.

On 27 November 1938, St. Nicholas' won the championship following a 2-01 to 0-02 defeat of Clonakilty in the final. This was their first championship title.

Results

Final

Championship statistics

Miscellaneous
 St. Nicholas' win their first title.
 St. Nicholas'  sister club Glen Rovers also won the Cork Hurling Championship. The following players completed the double: Paddy O'Donovan, Danny Matt Dorgan, Jack Lynch, Connie Buckley, Dan Moylan, Charlie Tobin and Tim Kiely.

References

Cork Senior Football Championship